Peter Nils-Gösta Larsson (born 8 March 1961) is a Swedish former professional footballer who played as a centre-back.

He represented Halmstads BK, IFK Göteborg, Ajax, and AIK during a professional career that spanned between 1982 and 1993. A full international between 1983 and 1992, he won 47 caps and scored four goals for the Sweden national team and represented his country at the 1990 FIFA World Cup.

In 1987, he was awarded Guldbollen as Sweden's best footballer of the year.

Club career 
Larsson began his career in IF Hallby in Jönköping 1971–81. Later he played for Halmstads BK in Allsvenskan, after that he had a successful career at IFK Göteborg, where he won the Allsvenskan title three times, and also won the UEFA Cup in 1987. He turned professional with
AFC Ajax 1987–91. After that he played for AIK and became Swedish champion again in 1992.

International career 
Larsson made 47 appearances for the Sweden national football team and scored four goals. He was a part of the squad for the 1990 FIFA World Cup.

Managerial career 
In 2001, Larsson became assistant coach for AIK in Allsvenskan, working under his former national team coach Olle Nordin, and when Nordin left the coach job due to illness shortly before the 2002 season, Larsson became head coach. His career however became short – after seven games with only one win, Larsson decided to quit. Ha hasn't returned to high level football thereafter.

Career statistics

International 

International goals
Scores and results list Sweden's goal tally first.

Honours 
IFK Göteborg

 UEFA Cup: 1986–87

 Swedish Champion: 1984, 1987

Ajax

 Eredivisie: 1989–90

AIK

 Swedish Champion: 1992

Individual

 Guldbollen: 1987
 Stor Grabb: 1987

References

External links 

 http://wwwc.aftonbladet.se/sport/guldbollen/1987.html
 https://web.archive.org/web/20071007122230/http://www.aik.se/fotboll/aikindex.html?%2Ffotboll%2Fhistorik%2F500aikare%2Fpetelars.html

1961 births
Living people
Swedish footballers
Sweden international footballers
Sweden under-21 international footballers
Swedish expatriate footballers
Allsvenskan players
Eredivisie players
AIK Fotboll managers
AIK Fotboll players
AFC Ajax players
Halmstads BK players
IFK Göteborg players
1990 FIFA World Cup players
Expatriate footballers in the Netherlands
UEFA Cup winning players
Association football midfielders
Swedish football managers
People from Torsby Municipality
Sportspeople from Värmland County